August Belmont IV (December 30, 1908 – July 10, 1995) was an American Investment banker and thoroughbred racehorse owner.

Biography
He was born on December 30, 1908, to August Belmont III (1882–1919) and Alice W. de Goicouria, he was a fourth generation banker and racehorse owner.

While a nineteen-year-old student he inherited Belcourt Castle in Newport, Rhode Island, from his uncle, Oliver Belmont. However, he did not keep the property and it was transferred to another uncle, Perry Belmont. A graduate of Harvard University, in 1931 August Belmont IV went to work for the securities firm of Bonbright & Co. and remained in the industry for the rest of his working life. In the latter part of the 1940s he was hired by close friend Douglas Dillon to work for Dillon, Read & Co. Belmont became a partner in the investment banking firm and served as its president from 1962 until his retirement in 1971.

He was first married in 1931 to Elizabeth Lee Saltonstall of Boston with whom he had four children. They divorced in 1946 and he married Mrs. Louise Vietor Winston.

In 1982, August Belmont IV became chairman of The Jockey Club.

A resident of Syosset on Long Island, New York, following his retirement from banking August Belmont IV made his home in Easton, Maryland, where he died in 1995 at age eighty-six.

Racing
August Belmont IV followed a family tradition by becoming active as a racehorse owner. However, his involvement was to a far lesser extent than his grandfather, August Belmont Jr., founder of Belmont Park, and his great-grandfather, August Belmont, for whom the third leg of the U.S. Triple Crown series, the Belmont Stakes is named. Among his stakes race winners he owned alone or in partnerships were Dew Line, Heed, Quadratic, and Caveat with whom he won the 1983 Belmont Stakes.

References

Further reading
 July 13, 1995 New York Times obituary for August Belmont IV
 June 20, 1983 Sports Illustrated article by Bill Nack on Caveat's win in the Belmont Stakes
 1935 photo at Getty Images of August Belmont IV & his first wife

1908 births
1995 deaths
American investment bankers
American racehorse owners and breeders
Belmont family
Harvard University alumni
People from Easton, Maryland
People from Syosset, New York
20th-century American businesspeople
Businesspeople from New York City
American inventors